Block model can be:
 Building block model, in construction
 Block model, in network science